Real Esteli Fútbol Club is a Nicaraguan football club playing in the top flight of Nicaragua's league system, the Campeonato Nacional de Fútbol de Primera División. The club play out of their home stadium, Estadio Independencia, based in the northern city of Estelí.

Real Estelí has 18 national championships, more than any other team in Nicaragua (except Diriangén).  They also won a CONCACAF record eight consecutive championships from 2006 to 2014.

History

The club was founded in 1960 as Estelí FC, adding Real to its name in 1961.  Estelí FC plays at the Estadio Independencia, one of the biggest stadiums in Nicaragua, with a capacity of 4,800. The club is known by the nickname, El Tren del Norte (Train of the North), coming as it does, from the northern region of Las Segovias.

Real Estelí has finished in the top five of Nicaragua's top flight every year since 1986.  In that time, they have also achieved traditionally high attendance numbers.  However, it took time for the club's burgeoning popularity to translate into championships.  They won their first title in 1991, then added another in 1999.  Nonetheless, their fierce rivals Diriangén FC remained the dominant power in Nicaraguan football.

This began to change in 2002–2003.  The two clubs met for a two-legged tie to determine the year's champion.  Diriangén won the first leg 1–0, but Real Estelí answered by winning the return match 3–0, claiming the title 3–1 on aggregate.  That was the last year Nicaragua determined their championship with a "long season"; for 2003–2004, the league adopted an Apertura/Clausura format.  Real Estelí won both tournaments, and each time they defeated Diriangén in the finals.

The following September, Real Estelí made history in Nicaraguan football by eliminating favorites Real España in the First Round of the Copa Interclubes UNCAF.  They thus became the first Nicaraguan football team in history to advance to the second round of the tournament.

Back home, Diriangén won the next two championships, but quickly gave way to Real Estelí, who embarked on their dominant run of eight championships in a row from 2006 to 2014.  Then, after a brief interruption by Walter Ferretti, Estelí won two more.

Real Estelí FC has finished in the top five of Nicaragua's top division every year since 1986 and has achieved some of the highest attendances in the league during this period.

Crest

The club crest consists of a crown, representing 'Real' (meaning 'Royal').  Similar crowns can be seen on the crests of many other clubs with the prefix 'Real', such as Spanish clubs Real Betis, Real Zaragoza and Real Madrid

The two gold stars of the crest mark the first two national championships won by the club (in 1991 and 1999), while the red and white striped shield represents the club colours as used on team shirts. The logo was redesigned and digitalised in 2000 by Nakor'd J. García and Michael D. Raney (current President/CEO of the World Football Organization), based on the original design by Arnulfo Rivera Zeledón and Johnny Herrera Vallejos.

'El Clásico' rivalry
There is often a fierce rivalry between the two strongest teams in the national league, where the game between Real Estelí and Diriangén has become known as El Clásico (The Classic).

Current squad
As of August 2022

Former players

  Dshon Forbes (capped for Nicaragua)

Personnel

Management

List of Coaches
Real Esteli has had various coaches since its formation in 1961. Ramón Otoniel Olivas and Honduran Roy Posas has served two terms as head coach. Ramón Otoniel Olivas was the club's most successful coach, having won  Primera División titles, following closely is Roy Posas, Sergio Rodriguez and Holver Flores & Leonidas Rodriguez won one Primera titles.

Jersey sponsors

Performance in CONCACAF competitions
CONCACAF Champions League: 6 appearances
Best: Group stage in 4 times
2009 : Preliminary Round
2012 : Preliminary Round
2013 : Group stage
2014 : Group stage
2015 : Group stage
2017 : Group stage
2021: Round of 16

CONCACAF League: 5 appearances
Best: Quarter-finals in 2020
2017 CONCACAF League: Round of 16
2019 CONCACAF League: Round of 16
2020 CONCACAF League: Quarter finals
2021 CONCACAF League: Round of 16
2022 CONCACAF League: Preliminary Round

Copa Interclubes UNCAF: 5 appearances
Best: Quarter-finals in 2004
2000 : First Round
2003 : First Round
2004 : Quarter-finals
2006 : First Round
2007 : First Round

Record versus other nations
 As of 15 April 2021
The Concacaf opponents below = Official tournament results: 
(Plus a sampling of other results)

Honours

Campeonato Nacional/Primera División de Nicaragua:  1991, 1998–99, 2002–03, 2003–04, 2006–07, 2007–08, 2008–09, 2009–10, 2010–11, 2011–12, 2012–13, 2013–14, 2015–16, 2016–17, 2019 Clausura, 2019 Apertura, 2020 Clausura, Apertura 2020, 2022 Apertura
 Copa de Nicaragua: 1991

See also
Real Estelí Baloncesto

References

External links

Real Estelí FC | Sitio Oficial

Football clubs in Nicaragua
Association football clubs established in 1961
 
1961 establishments in Nicaragua
Estelí